Macomb is a surname that may refer to the following persons:

Alexander Macomb, Sr. (1748–1831), Irish-American merchant and land speculator in Detroit and New York; father of Alexander Macomb, U.S. Army general; namesake of Macomb's Purchase
Alexander Macomb, Jr. (1782–1841), hero of the War of 1812; commanding general of the U.S. Army (1828–1841); namesake of Macomb County, Michigan
David B. Macomb (1827–1911), U.S. Navy rear admiral and engineering officer during the American Civil War; the grandson of William Macomb, merchant; with his cousin William H., namesake of the World War II-era destroyer 
John Navarre Macomb, Jr. (1811-1889), topographical engineer, explorer of the Colorado River, U.S. Army colonel; nephew of Maj. Gen. Alexander Macomb and son-in-law of Commodore John Rodgers
Montgomery Meigs Macomb (1852-1924), U.S. Army brigadier general; son of John Navarre Macomb, Jr., namesake of Macomb Ridge in Yosemite National Park
William Macomb (1751–1796), Irish-British fur trader, merchant and landowner in Detroit, member of first parliament of Upper Canada, brother of Alexander the land speculator
William H. Macomb (1819–1872), American naval officer during the American Civil War; son of Maj. Gen. Alexander Macomb; with his cousin David, namesake of USS Macomb

See also
Macomber (disambiguation)
McComb (surname)